Ledjon Muçaj (born 4 September 1992) is an Albanian footballer who currently plays as a midfielder for KS Besa Kavajë in Kategoria e Parë.

References

External links
Ledjon Muçaj at Fupa

 

1992 births
Living people
Sportspeople from Fier
Association football midfielders
Albanian footballers
KF Bylis Ballsh players
KF Apolonia Fier players
Besa Kavajë players
SC Gjilani players
KF Ballkani players
KF Vushtrria players
Kategoria Superiore players
Kategoria e Parë players
Football Superleague of Kosovo players
Albanian expatriate footballers
Expatriate footballers in Kosovo
Albanian expatriate sportspeople in Kosovo
Expatriate footballers in Germany
Albanian expatriate sportspeople in Germany